The Church of the Nativity of the Most Holy Mother of God ( / Crkva Mala Gospojina) is a Serbian Orthodox Church in Obilić, central Kosovo. As of 2008, it serves some 2,200 Serbs in the municipality of Obilić. It is ecclesiastically part of the Eparchy of Raška and Prizren.

It was left during the Kosovo War. The first liturgical service was held in 2003, on the Nativity of the Theotokos (8 September). It was damaged in the 2004 unrest (17–18 March) but has since been partially renovated.

References

External links

Obilić
Serbian Orthodox church buildings in Kosovo
Landmarks in Kosovo
Attacks on churches in Europe
Cultural heritage of Kosovo